Peravurani block is a revenue block in the Peravurani taluk of Thanjavur district, Tamil Nadu, India. There are 26 villages in the block. The block development office is located at Avanam.

List of Panchayat villages

References 

 

Revenue blocks of Thanjavur district